Los Molinos Club de Fútbol is a Spanish football team based in Almería, in the autonomous community of Andalusia. Founded in 1973, it plays in Primera Andaluza Almería, holding home matches at Complejo Deportivo Municipal de Los Molinos, commonly known as Constantino Cortés Fortes, with a capacity of 400 people.

Season to season

2 seasons in Tercera División

External links
Official website 
La Preferente profile 
Fútbol Regional profile 

Football clubs in Andalusia
Association football clubs established in 1973
1973 establishments in Spain
Sport in Almería